Kanpur Teachers constituency is one of 100 Legislative Council seats in Uttar Pradesh. This constituency comes under Kanpur Nagar, Kanpur Dehat and Unnao district.

Members of Legislative Council
 1962 :Raja Ram Pande (Teacher)
 1974 :Mool Krishna Chaturvedi (Teacher)
 1980 :Hari Prasad Tripathi    (Teacher)
 1986 :Chandra Bhushan Tripathi (Teacher)
 1992 :Raj Bahadur Singh Chandel (Teacher)
 1998 :Raj Bahadur Singh Chandel (Teacher)
 2004 :Raj Bahadur Singh Chandel (Teacher)
 2010 :Raj Bahadur Singh Chandel (Teacher)
 2017 :Raj Bahadur Singh Chandel (Teacher)
2023:Raj Bahadur Singh Chandel(teacher)

Term of tenure
Retirement after 6 years.

Party View
Non Political party view

Election
Next election is proposed in October -November 2022

See also
Kanpur (Graduates constituency)
Kanpur Cantonment (Assembly constituency)
Kanpur (Lok Sabha constituency)

References

External links

Uttar Pradesh Vidhanparishad
विरोध : मूल्यांकन की हिम्मत न जुटा सके शिक्षक
Shri Raj Bhahadur Singh Chandel (Independent(IND)):(ELECTED FROM TEACHERS CONSTITUENCY) - Affidavit Information of Candidate:

Uttar Pradesh Legislative Council
Teachers constituencies in India